Marfa Matveyevna Apraksina (1664 – 1716) was a Tsarina of Russia and the second spouse of Tsar Feodor III of Russia.

Biography
Daughter of steward Matvey Vasilyevich Apraksin and Domna Bogdanovna Apraksina, nee Lovchikova. Martha had three brothers - Peter, Fyodor and Andrey, who later became major statesmen.

She was married to the widowed tsar in 1681 by his friend Ivan Yazykov, who was with the Apraksins in the property. With this marriage, Yazykov hoped to strengthen his position at court. The candidacy of the royal bride was approved by Metropolitan Hilarion, close to the Apraksin family. She received the status of a royal bride in December 1681. The wedding of a 17-year-old girl and a 20-year-old king took place on 15 (25) February 1682.

Martha Matveyevna was queen for only 71 days - from 15 (25) February to 27 April (7 May) 1682. The king died of scurvy on 27 April (7 May), and Martha, being childless, wore mourning for more than 33 years, being a dowager queen and, according to some assumptions, a virgin. There are allegations that Peter the Great revered the childlessness of this short marriage as the reason for the transition to him of the royal crown.

Widowed, the tsarina lived in Moscow, and then in St. Petersburg in her own palace, at the corner of Admiralty Square and Nevskaya Prospect, not far from the mansion of her brother, Admiral General F. M. Apraksin, where the Winter Palace is now located. By her skillful behavior, she created a strong position for herself at court. Having retained the trust and respect of her husband's younger brother, Peter I, she remained in the care of the treasury until the end of her life, without entering into the intrigues of state and political life. In the royal family, which was vast by that time (it included the widow of Ivan V of Russia, Queen Praskovia Saltykova with three daughters), Queen Martha was respected.

In December 1715, Queen Martha visited the sick tsar, but suddenly fell ill herself. On 25, 28 and 30 December, the already cured tsar himself visited Martha Matveyevna.  On 31 December she died. According to Friedrich Christian Weber, the cause of the queen's death was her poisoning with pickled mushrooms. The emperor personally attended the autopsy, according to Prince Pyotr Vladimirovich Dolgorukov, the tsar "wanted to know the truth about this short marriage." Peter I "with his characteristic cynicism ... did not stop before examining the corpse: only having convinced himself of the virginity of his deceased daughter-in-law with his own eyes, he handed over to the admiral-general the enormous riches bequeathed to her brother for life".

The tsarina's funeral took place on 7 January 1716 in the Peter and Paul Cathedral in Saint Petersburg (listed as number 4 in the list of burials).

Queen Martha was an extremely devout woman, remaining an adherent of the old rituals. It was she who was the last member of the royal family, whose funeral service and burial were carried out in accordance with ancient traditions, which were inherent in lamentations over the coffin of the deceased. After being present at the burial of Queen Martha Matveyevna, Tsar Peter issued a decree prohibiting the old Russian rite of grieving for the dead.

References

Grigoryan VG Romanov. Biographical Directory. - Moscow: AST, 2007.

|-

|-

1664 births
1716 deaths
17th-century Russian people
18th-century people from the Russian Empire
17th-century Russian women
18th-century women from the Russian Empire
Russian tsarinas
Russian nobility
Burials at Saints Peter and Paul Cathedral, Saint Petersburg